Eurodachtha canigella is a moth in the family Lecithoceridae. It was described by Aristide Caradja in 1920. It is found in Germany, France, Italy and on the Iberian Peninsula.

The forewings are deep black and the hindwings are grey.

References

Moths described in 1920
Eurodachtha